Oleksandr Volodymyrovych Avramenko (born 22 March 1999) is a Ukrainian professional footballer who plays as a centre-back for Ukrainian Premier League club Metalist Kharkiv.

References

External links
 
 

1999 births
Living people
Footballers from Dnipro
Ukrainian footballers
Ukraine youth international footballers
Association football defenders
FC Metalist Kharkiv players
FC Zorya Luhansk players
FC Karpaty Lviv players
FC Karpaty Halych players
Ukrainian Second League players